Ahone (also known as Rawottonemd) was the chief god and creator in the religion of the Native American Powhatan tribe and related Algonquians in the Virginia Tidewater area. According to tribal legend, Ahone created the world as a flat disk with the Powhatan tribe at its center. He was also considered to be detached from mankind and required no offerings or sacrifices like many other gods. The god Oki was his wrathful counterpart.

See also
Gitche Manitou
Wakan Tanka
Great Spirit

References

The story of Virginia: An American Experience

Creator gods
Gods of the indigenous peoples of North America
Nanticoke tribe
Powhatan Confederacy